The Church of the Transfiguration of the Lord in Mohovo is a Serbian Orthodox church in eastern Croatia. The church was constructed in between 1836 and 1839 with the iconostasis from 1857 built by Bogdan Đukić from Tovarnik, the same artist who built the iconostasis in Serbian Orthodox church in Petrovci. After the first general restoration in 1936 the new general restoration of the building was initiated in 2017.

See also
 Eparchy of Osječko polje and Baranja
 Serbs of Croatia
 List of Serbian Orthodox churches in Croatia
 Monasteries of Fruška Gora
 Patriarchate of Karlovci

References

Mohovo
19th-century Eastern Orthodox church buildings
Ilok